In enzymology, a glucose 1-dehydrogenase (FAD, quinone) is an enzyme that catalyzes the chemical reaction

D-glucose + a quinone  D-glucono-1,5-lactone + a quinol

Thus, the two substrates of this enzyme are D-glucose and a quinone, whereas its two products are D-glucono-1,5-lactone and a quinol.

This enzyme belongs to the family of oxidoreductases, specifically those acting on the CH-OH group of donor with other acceptors. The systematic name of this enzyme class is D-glucose:acceptor 1-oxidoreductase. Other names in common use include glucose dehydrogenase (Aspergillus), glucose dehydrogenase (decarboxylating), and D-glucose:(acceptor) 1-oxidoreductase. This enzyme participates in pentose phosphate pathway. It employs one cofactor, FAD.

References 

 

EC 1.1.99
Flavoproteins
Enzymes of unknown structure